Daniel William Finkelstein, Baron Finkelstein,  (born 30 August 1962) is a British journalist and politician. He is a former executive editor of The Times and remains a weekly political columnist. He is a former chairman of Policy Exchange who was succeeded by David Frum in 2014. He is chair of the think tank Onward. He was made a member of the House of Lords in August 2013, sitting as a Conservative.

Background
Finkelstein is Jewish; his mother, Mirjam Finkelstein, was a Holocaust survivor of the Bergen-Belsen concentration camp, while his father Ludwik Finkelstein OBE was born in Lviv (then in Poland but now in Ukraine), and became Professor of Measurement and Instrumentation at City University London. He is a grandson, via his mother, of Dr Alfred Wiener, the Jewish activist and founder of the Wiener Library. He is the brother of Professor Sir Anthony Finkelstein CBE FREng, President of City, University of London  and of Tamara Finkelstein,  Permanent Secretary at the Department for Environment, Food and Rural Affairs.

He was educated at University College School, the London School of Economics (BSc, 1984) and City University London (MSc, 1986).

Political career

SDP
Between 1981 and 1988, Finkelstein was a member of the Social Democratic Party (SDP), becoming Chair of the Young Social Democrats on the defection of his predecessor Keith Toussaint to the Conservative Party during the 1983 general election campaign. Subsequently, he was elected youth representative on its National Committee and selected as a parliamentary candidate for Brent East at the 1987 general election. At around this time, Finkelstein became a close ally and adviser to David Owen, the SDP leader. When the merger with the Liberal Party was proposed, Finkelstein was among the leading opponents and refused to join the merged party, instead following Owen into the 'continuing' SDP. After Owen had announced his resignation from politics in 1992, Finkelstein was the spokesman for a group of young SDP members who joined the Conservatives.

Think tanks
Before working for the Conservative Party, Finkelstein was Director of a think-tank, the Social Market Foundation, for three years. During his period with the SMF, the organisation brought New York police commissioner Bill Bratton to London, for the first time introducing UK politicians to the new strategies being used there.

Finkelstein formerly sat on the Board of Governors of the Gatestone Institute, a far-right think-tank known for publishing anti-Muslim articles. In a series of tweets in 2018, Finkelstein explained that he "didn't initially accept the critics' characterisation of (Gatestone)", that he thought they'd done "valuable" work, but that he eventually withdrew from the position due to 'the volume' of Gatestone publications he disagreed with. He acknowledged that his failure to do so earlier was "worthy of criticism".

In 2018 he became chairman of the new think-tank Onward, whose mission is to renew the centre right for the next generation.

Conservative Party 
Between 1995 and 1997 Finkelstein was Director of the Conservative Research Department and in that capacity advised Prime Minister John Major and attended meetings of the Cabinet when it sat in political session. Finkelstein became among the earliest advocates of the 'modernisation' of the Conservative Party, laying out the principles of change in a series of speeches and columns in The Times.

Between 1997 and 2001 he was political adviser to the Leader of the Opposition William Hague and, together with George Osborne, Secretary to the Shadow Cabinet.

In the 2001 election Finkelstein was the unsuccessful Conservative parliamentary candidate in Harrow West.

Journalism

Between 1990 and 1992, Finkelstein was the editor of Connexion, Britain's first Internet and data communications newspaper. Finkelstein joined The Times in August 2001 as part of the leader writing team and was Comment Editor from March 2004 to June 2008. He became Chief Leader Writer in June 2008. He began The Times blog Comment Central in September 2006. He is also a regular columnist in The Jewish Chronicle. His weekly football statistics column, the Fink Tank, began in 2002 and runs in The Times on Saturdays.

Honours and awards
Finkelstein was awarded the OBE in the 1997 honours list.
In 2011 he was awarded the "PSA 2011 Journalist of the Year Award". It was announced at the beginning of August 2013 that Finkelstein was to be made a life peer. He was created Baron Finkelstein, of Pinner in the London Borough of Harrow on 11 September 2013.

Finkelstein was given an honorary Doctor of Science degree by City University London in 2011.
	
He is a Vice President of the Jewish Leadership Council.

References

External links
Articles by Daniel Finkelstein Journalisted
Opinion – Daniel Finkelstein Times Online
Daniel Finkelstein Twitter

1962 births
Living people
People educated at University College School
Alumni of the London School of Economics
Alumni of City, University of London
Jewish British politicians
British male journalists
Place of birth missing (living people)
British people of Polish-Jewish descent
British sportswriters
Conservative Party (UK) life peers
Officers of the Order of the British Empire
Social Democratic Party (UK) parliamentary candidates
Conservative Party (UK) officials
The Times people
Conservative Party (UK) parliamentary candidates
Newspaper leader writers
Life peers created by Elizabeth II